Jean-Sébastien Fecteau (born May 7, 1975) is a Canadian former pair skater. He is a two-time World Junior silver medallist with Caroline Haddad, the 2001 Nebelhorn Trophy silver medallist with Valerie Saurette, and the 2006 Four Continents silver medallist with Utako Wakamatsu.

Career 
From 1990 to 1994, Fecteau competed internationally with Caroline Haddad. They won silver medals at the 1992 and 1994 World Junior Championships.

In 1995, Fecteau began competing with Valerie Saurette. They competed on the Grand Prix series for three seasons, twice at the Four Continents (best result was fourth), and once at the World Championships, placing 13th. They won the silver medal at the 2001 Nebelhorn Trophy and three bronze medals at the Canadian Championships. Their partnership ended in early 2002.

In April 2002, Fecteau teamed up with Japanese skater Utako Wakamatsu to compete for Canada. In 2003, they won gold medals at the Finlandia Trophy and Nebelhorn Trophy and made their Grand Prix debut. 

In the 2004–05 season, Wakamatsu/Fecteau won silver at the 2005 Canadian Championships and were sent to the 2005 World Championships where they placed eighth.

In the 2005–06 season, the pair won bronze at a Grand Prix event, the 2005 NHK Trophy. They also took bronze at the 2006 Canadian Championships and were sent to the 2006 Four Continents Championships where they won the silver medal.

Fecteau announced his competitive retirement on April 24, 2007.

Personal life 
In 2007, Fecteau said he planned to study civil engineering at the École Polytechnique de Montréal.
He completed his studies and is now working as a Transportation Engineer.

Programs

With Wakamatsu

With Saurette

Competitive highlights

With Wakamatsu

With Saurette

With Haddad

References

External links

 
 Official site

1975 births
Canadian male pair skaters
Living people
Sportspeople from Thetford Mines
Four Continents Figure Skating Championships medalists
Sportspeople from Quebec
World Junior Figure Skating Championships medalists
20th-century Canadian people
21st-century Canadian people